Aulonocara korneliae, known in the aquarium fish trade as the Aulonocara Chizumulu, Aulonocara blue gold or blue orchard Aulanocara, is a species of haplochromine cichlid.

It is endemic to Lake Malawi in East Africa, and only known from around the Chizumulu Island.

The specific name honours the wife of Manfred K. Meyer, Kornelia Meyer.

References

Fish of Malawi
korneliae
Taxa named by Manfred K. Meyer
Taxa named by Rüdiger Riehl
Taxa named by Horst Zetzsche
Fish described in 1987
Taxonomy articles created by Polbot
Fish of Lake Malawi